The 2015 UCI Women's Road World Cup is the 18th and last edition of the UCI Women's Road World Cup and part of the 2015 UCI women's calendar.

One race was added compared to the 2014 edition: The Philadelphia Cycling Classic. This race was already on the women's calendar since 2013. The addition of this race caused the World Cup to be held on three continents.



Races

Final World Cup Standings

See also
2015 in women's road cycling

References

External links
Official site

 
UCI Women's Road World Cup
UCI Women's Road World Cup